Achatinella abbreviata, an Oahu tree snail, is an extinct species of colorful tropical tree-living air-breathing land snail, an arboreal pulmonate gastropod mollusk in the genus Achatinella.

Shell description 
The dextral shell is ovate and somewhat ventricose with convex whorls margined round the upper shell. The shell has six whorls. The spire is rather short and obtuse at the apex. The columella is callous and twisted. Olive-yellow, with a black-brown line at the sutures; the lower part of the last whorl is very dark green and the apex is black.

The height of the shell is 19.0 mm. The width of the shell is 10.0 mm.

Distribution
This species was endemic to the Hawaiʻian island of Oʻahu.

Conservation status
This species is considered to be extinct. The IUCN Red List first listed it extinct in 1990.

References
This article incorporates public domain text (a public domain work of the United States Government) from reference.

External links

†abbreviata
Extinct gastropods
Biota of Oahu
Molluscs of Hawaii
Endemic fauna of Hawaii
Taxonomy articles created by Polbot
ESA endangered species
Gastropods described in 1850